This is a list of lists of a cappella groups.

Lists
There are several lists of a cappella groups, listings of groups that sing a cappella.

 List of professional a cappella groups
 Lists of collegiate a cappella groups
 List of collegiate a cappella groups in the United States
 List of Stanford University a cappella groups
 List of university a cappella groups in the United Kingdom
 List of alumni of collegiate a cappella groups

A cappella musical groups
Groups lists
Lists of groups
A capella groups
A capella groups